Elizabeth Kay (born 9 July 1949 in London) is an English writer. She is the author of The Divide trilogy, a series of children's fantasy novels, originally published by Chicken House Press, then picked up by Scholastic Books

Biography

Before going to art school she attended Nonsuch High School for girls in Cheam. Then went to art school and in her mid-twenties started writing radio plays, which were broadcast on BBC Radio 4. She also wrote stories which were published in newspapers and magazines and broadcast on Capital Radio in London.

Kay has an MA (distinction) in creative writing from Bath Spa University, and has taught both creative writing and art for a number of years. She has illustrated several books and produced nearly all the artwork for her own website. An avid wildlife enthusiast, she has travelled extensively to places as diverse as the Ivory Coast, Borneo, Iceland and India.

She has won several awards, including the Cardiff International Poetry Competition for a sestina "Pond Life" and the Canongate Prize for her short story "Cassie". A chapbook of poetry, The Spirit Collection, was published in 2000.

The Divide, her first book for children, was published in 2003. She was a keynote speaker at Accio 2005, the Harry Potter conference, and spoke at a children's book conference in Ukraine in 2007. She has appeared at other literary events, including the Cheltenham and Edinburgh festivals.

She has had three shorter books for children published by Barrington Stoke. Fury, in 2008, Hunted in 2009 and Lost in the Desert in 2011. The Tree Devil, for reluctant readers, was published in 2010 by Eprint. A novella for adults, Missing Link, was published in October 2009.

A new novella for adults was published on the Kindle and iPad in 2012, called Beware of Men with Moustaches, which was shortlisted for the Dundee International Book Prize. Four British poets accept an invitation to make a cultural visit to a little-known ex-Soviet country and soon find themselves in a Kafkaesque labyrinth of mistaken identities, fake email addresses, impossibly high stilettos and impossibly cheap vodka. The characters gradually become aware of their own insularity in a country which is struggling to come to terms with its new identity – and where people have more to worry about than whether or not their next poetry collection is going to be published.

Her latest book is Ice Feathers, set in prehistoric Antarctica when the coastal strip may have been ice-free. Birds have filled all the evolutionary niches, and the main predator is a giant eagle - based on Haast's eagle, which survived in New Zealand until relatively recently, and was capable of preying on man. It is aimed at the same audience as The Divide, and is an exciting story about a girl who steals a flightless riding bird, similar to phorusrhacus, and runs away because her aunt is trying to marry her off to get rid of her.

She has two adult daughters.

References

External links

 Elizabeth Kay's website

1949 births
Living people
British fantasy writers
British children's writers
Alumni of Bath Spa University
People educated at Nonsuch High School